Under the Fig Trees is a 2021 Tunisian drama film directed by , starring Fidé Fdhili, Feten Fdhili, Ameni Fdhili, Samar Sifi, Leila Ouhebi, Hneya Ben Elhedi Sbahi, Gaith Mendassi, Abdelhak Mrabti, Fedi Ben Achour and Firas Amri.

Cast
 Fidé Fdhili as Fidé
 Feten Fdhili as Melek
 Ameni Fdhili as Sana
 Samar Sifi
 Leila Ouhebi as Leila
 Hneya Ben Elhedi Sbahi
 Gaith Mendassi
 Abdelhak Mrabti as Abdou
 Fedi Ben Achour
 Firas Amri as Firas

Reception
Lovia Gyarkye of The Hollywood Reporter wrote that "The languid, relaxed body language, the clipped cadences of shared stories, and the affection with which the women speak to each other even during moments of tension all bolster the film’s realism and its sense of soul."

Amber Wilkinson of Screen Daily wrote that "Sehiri has already proved herself as a documentarian with the award-winning Railway Men, and she brings that same sense of naturalism to her debut fiction feature".

See also
 List of submissions to the 95th Academy Awards for Best International Feature Film
 List of Tunisian submissions for the Academy Award for Best International Feature Film

References

External links
 
 
2021 films
2021 drama films
Tunisian drama films
French drama films
Swiss drama films
2020s Arabic-language films